Sodium superoxide is the inorganic compound with the formula NaO2. This yellow-orange solid is a salt of the superoxide anion.  It is an intermediate in the oxidation of sodium by oxygen.

Preparation
NaO2 is prepared by treating sodium peroxide with oxygen at high pressures:
Na2O2  +  O2  →  2 NaO2
It can also be prepared by careful oxygenation of a solution of sodium in ammonia:
Na(in NH3) + O2 → NaO2

It is also produced, along with sodium peroxide, when sodium is stored under inappropriate conditions (e.g. in dirty or partially halogenated solvents).

Properties
The product is paramagnetic, as expected for a salt of the  anion.  It hydrolyses readily to give a mixture of sodium hydroxide, oxygen and hydrogen peroxide.  It crystallizes in the NaCl motif.

References

Superoxides
Sodium compounds
Photographic chemicals
Oxidizing agents